Marjorie Gaffney (1897–1963) was a British actress and screenwriter. She also worked as an assistant director on a number of films.

Selected filmography

Actress
 Garryowen (1920)
 Victory (1928)

Assistant director
 Atlantic (1929)
 The W Plan (1930)

Screenwriter
 Night of the Garter (1933)
 Lady in Danger (1934)
 Evergreen (1934)
 My Old Dutch (1934)
 First a Girl (1935)
 Me and Marlborough (1935)
 Sunset in Vienna (1937)
 The Rat (1938)
 The Mind of Mr. Reeder (1939)

References

Bibliography
 Harper, Sue. Women in British Cinema: Mad, Bad and Dangerous to Know. A&C Black, 2000.

External links

1897 births
1963 deaths
British film actresses
Actresses from Liverpool
20th-century British screenwriters
20th-century English women
20th-century English people